Louis Jani (born December 6, 1957 in Montreal, Quebec) is a  judoka from Canada, who represented his native country at two consecutive Summer Olympics: 1984 and 1988. He had unfortunately missed the 1980 Moscow Olympics due to Canada's boycott. Louis twice won the gold medal at the Pan American Games (1979 and 1983) in the middleweight division (– 86 kg). Competing as a member of Team Canada for 15 years, Louis went on to become the Technical Director for Judo Canada and eventually the National Coach. As National Coach he led the Canadian team at the 2000 Olympic Summer Games in Sydney, Australia, where Nicolas Gill won a silver medal.
Currently Louis Jani lives in Ottawa, Ontario and works as a Manager of Regional Affairs at the Department of Canadian Heritage.

References
 Profile

See all
Judo in Canada
List of Canadian judoka

1957 births
Canadian male judoka
Judoka at the 1984 Summer Olympics
Judoka at the 1988 Summer Olympics
Living people
Olympic judoka of Canada
Sportspeople from Montreal
Pan American Games gold medalists for Canada
Pan American Games medalists in judo
Judoka at the 1979 Pan American Games
Judoka at the 1983 Pan American Games
Medalists at the 1979 Pan American Games
Medalists at the 1983 Pan American Games
21st-century Canadian people
20th-century Canadian people